Krucina is a Polish coat of arms. It was used by the Korniakt family (szlachta) in the Polish–Lithuanian Commonwealth.

History

Granted on February 12, 1571 to Konstanty Korniakt of Crete, a Greek born merchant based in Lwów. The name of the crest comes from the nickname Kruszyna (a mite).

Related coat of arms
 Krucini (Krzyż III)

See also

 Polish heraldry
 Heraldic family
 List of Polish nobility coats of arms

Bibliography
 Tadeusz Gajl: Herbarz polski od średniowiecza do XX wieku : ponad 4500 herbów szlacheckich 37 tysięcy nazwisk 55 tysięcy rodów. L&L, 2007. .

References

Antoniewicz